Frédéric Pierucci, (born 14 January 1968), is a former senior manager for Alstom, accused of corruption by the United States government in 2014. He was arrested and detained in United States, where he was held as an economic hostage.

His story is an example of the hostage diplomacy and economic warfare waged by the United States, including against its purported allies. Indeed, Pierucci's arrest and imprisonment occurred while the American multinational conglomerate General Electric was negotiating with Alstom to purchase its energy section. Other French sources ask why the same case was not handled by France’s law enforcement authorities, since the criminal acts at issue are also illegal there.

Education and career 
He graduated from the ISAE-ENSMA and the INSEAD, and received an MBA from Columbia University.

During the 2000s, he became marketing and sales director in the boiler division of Alstom, a large French transportation and energy company.

Arrest, charges, plea and sentence 
In 2009, Alstom's practices were starting to attract the attention of the United States Department of Justice (DOJ). DOJ interest focused on suspicions that Alstom had violated the 1977 Foreign Corrupt Practices Act. This American law has extraterritorial scope in the sense that it deals with bribery of foreign public officials. Bribery of foreign public officials is a criminal offense not only in the United States, but also in France and all other parties to the OECD Anti-Bribery Convention. In addition, the DOJ takes what is often described as an ‘expansive’ view of its jurisdiction in FCPA matters, meaning that a wide range of firms or individuals could fall within the scope of DOJ enforcement measures.

Alstom attracted US jurisdiction by virtue of the fact that it was a US ‘Issuer’ (basically, that it had some involvement as an issuer on US securities markets). Pierucci was subject to FCPA enforcement because he was Vice-President of Global Sales at a Connecticut-based subsidiary of Alstom.

In 2010, the DOJ opened an investigation into Alstom's commercial practices, focusing , in particular, on a 2003 deal in Indonesia worth 118 million dollars. Alstom initially seemed to cooperate with the DOJ proceedings, but later refused to cooperate for several years.

On April 13, 2013, Frédéric Pierucci was arrested at the John F. Kennedy International Airport in New York. He was accused bribery of foreign public officials and conspiracy to bribe. More specifically, he was accused of being instrumental in hiring consultants who were used to channel bribes to members of the Indonesian Parliament and to officials of the state-owned electricity company in order to obtain a contract to provide power-related services.  

Immediately upon his arrest, he was invited to become an FBI informant inside Alstom, an offer which he refused. He was subsequently kept in custody and denied release on bail on the grounds that he was a flight risk (France has no extradition agreement with the United States). 

He was fired from Alstom on 20 September 2013, and thus stopped benefitting from their judicial assistance.

He spent 14 months in high-security prison facilities while awaiting trial. He was eventually able to secure bail after American friends provided guarantees. In September 2017, a Connecticut court condemned Pierucci to two years and a half in jail, including time spent awaiting trial. He was released in September 2018.

Aftermath 
In April 2014, Pierucci learned that the energy section of Alstom was sold to the American company General Electric. This led him to conclude that his arrest, denial of bail, and continued imprisonment were part of a strategy of economic warfare and hostage diplomacy. He self-describes as an "economic hostage". He eventually co-wrote a book about his experience: The American Trap. France Inter adapted the book as a radio show and podcast.

The French government had initially blocked General Electric's acquisition of Alstom. But after Arnaud Montebourg's resignation as Minister of the Economy and Finance, he was replaced by Emmanuel Macron, who relented and approved the sale. Pierucci was released on bail during the same week as the purchase.

In 2020, Frédéric Pierucci tried to organize French investors to buy back Alstom's former nuclear energy assets from General Electric. Arnaud Montebourg suggests the French government should lead the effort for strategic reasons.

Publications

References 

21st-century French essayists
INSEAD alumni
French aerospace engineers
Columbia Business School alumni
French whistleblowers
French businesspeople
French energy industry businesspeople
1968 births
Living people